Mirza Yusuf Ashtiani (1812 – 7 April 1886) also known as Mostowfi ol-Mamalek was the Grand Vizier of Iran during the reign of Nasser al-Din Shah and one of the most influential members of Qajar bureaucratic system at that time. He was from the conservative faction of the Qajar court and an opponent of Mirza Hosein Khan Moshir od-Dowleh and his reforms.

Mirza Yusuf Ashtiani, as one of the most influential members of Nasser al-Din Shah's court, played a role in many important events of his time, including the removal of Mirza Mohammad Khan Sepahsalar, the poisoning of Hossein Gholi Khan Ilkhani, the establishment of the Qajar bureaucracy and the expansion of Tehran.

Early life 
Mirza Yusuf was born in Ashtian. He was from the Mostowfian Ashtiani family, who were inheritable the Mostowfi (treasurer) of Ashtian and sometimes the court. After the death of his father, he became known as Mostowfi ol-Mamalek and took over the presidency of Mostowfis.

Political career 
He was considered and trusted by Amir Kabir due to his honesty and professionalism. When Mirza Aqa Khan Nuri came to power, he was afraid of Mirza Yusuf's influence and closeness. In addition, he always preferred to place his relatives and trustees in important positions, so he caused the deportation of Mirza Yusuf to Ashtian and gave Mostowfis the presidency to his son Mirza Kazem Nizam al-Mulk. After the dismissal of Mirza Aga Khan, he was again summoned to Tehran and regained his inherited position. 

Later, he became the tutor of Kamran Mirza, the young son of the Shah, a job that was equivalent to the government of Tehran and the director of real estate. After that, his sphere of influence and power gradually increased, until Nasser al-Din Shah became acquainted with the reformist ideas of Mirza Hosein Khan Moshir od-Dowleh. Moshir al-Dawla constantly talked to Nasser al-Din Shah about the need for reform in Iran, so Nasser al-Din Shah dismissed Mirza Yusuf and respectfully sent him to Ashtian. He was away from the political scene for two years, until he was called to Tehran after the dismissal and exile of Moshir al-Dawla to Gilan. After the exile of Mushir al-Dawla, Mirza Yusuf served as Grand Vizier informally from 1880 and formally from 1884 until his death in 1886.

In 1882, Mirza Yusuf noticed the rise to power of Hossein Gholi Khan, a Bakhtiari khan who had recently entered into an alliance with Mass'oud Mirza Zell-e Soltan, and on his orders he was poisoned with Qajar coffee. The expansion of Tehran during the reign of Nasser al-Din Shah was done under the supervision of Mirza Yusuf. He bought and settled many lands around Tehran from Nasser al-Din Shah. Hassanabad, Yousefabad, Behjatabad, Abbasabad, Amirabad and Vanak were among his gardens, and now neighborhoods with the same names have been built in their place. Mirza Yusuf appointed many of his relatives, such as Mirza Musa Ashtiani, and made reforms in the Qajar bureaucracy that were very powerful in favor of princes, governors, and courtiers. Mirza Yousef Ashtiani supported artists and politicians in addition to assassinating and suppressing many of his opponents.

During the reign of Mirza Yusuf, Nasser al-Din Shah gradually disregarded the duties of the monarchy and increasingly sought refuge in isolation and his own interests within Harem. Mirza Yusuf took advantage of the Shah's position and became the most powerful man in the court. Nasser al-Din Shah, who did not call anyone "Jenaab", called him "Jenaab Agha" (Your Excellency).

He was known for his humility and good morals, as he cherished the dervishes and befriended them. Alchemy was one of his favorite pastimes, and he was also interested in agriculture, horticulture, and bird breeding. Mirza Yusuf Ashtiani died on April 7, 1886; his title was inherited by his son, Mirza Hasan Ashtiani, who later became Prime Minister Ahmad Shah and Reza Shah.

Legacy 
Mirza Yusuf Ashtiani had a great influence on the time after him. Before him, the Shah and the Prime Minister (Grand Vizier) were two important poles and had the equal power, but with the reforms he made in the Qajar bureaucracy, the power of the Prime Minister increased sharply, and this increase was even greater with the Constitutional Revolution. The role of Mirza Yusuf in the influence of his family, the Mostowfian Ashtiani, is also very important because before him, the members of this family did not have much role in the court, but after him, five members of this family became prime minister. In today's society, he is known also as the person who made the Qajar coffee tradition to poison the opposition.

Honours 
 Order of Homayoun, 1869
 Order of the Lion and the Sun, 1874
 Neshan-e Aqdas, 1st Class, 1880
 Order of Ali, 1880

References 

Prime Ministers of Iran
Politicians from Tehran
Mostowfian Ashtiani family
1812 births
1886 deaths
19th-century Iranian politicians
Mostowfi ol-Mamaleks (title)
People of Qajar Iran